is a character franchise created by Sanrio, illustrated by character designer Mayumi Yanagita. The franchise was officially launched in 2017.

An anime television series adaptation by J.C.Staff aired on all TXN stations in Japan from April 2020 to April 2021. A second season titled Mewkledreamy Mix! aired from April 2021 to March 2022.

Story

Franchise
Mew is a light violet stuffed kitten created in a world from the sky by doll-making fairies. One day, she fell from the sky and was picked up by a human girl. The girl hugged and spoke with Mew every day. Hoping to express her gratitude to the girl, Mew made a wish to the moon. After the moonlight made Mew's star pattern in her ear shine, she began to be able to speak. Since then, Mew and the girl chat every day. They can have the same dream when they sleep together, while playing and exchanging secrets in the dream.

Anime

1st season
Yume is a cheerful first-year junior high school student who by chance caught Mew, a speaking kitten plush who fell from the sky. By becoming Dream Partners, Mew possesses the power of "Dream Synchro" and is able to enter one's dream along with Yume. That night, the queen of Miracle Dreamy Kingdom appeared in Yume's dream, telling her that if she and Mew collect a lot of Dreamy Stones, she can grant her one wish. Since then, Yume starts to collect Dreamy Stones with Mew, while enjoying her school life.

2nd season
Yume and Mew are a pair of Dream Partners who can perform Dream Synchro with Dreamy Compass and Mewkle Star. They are having their wonderful daily lives when one day, a baby plush kitten called Chia fell from the sky, and they began to take care of her. New enemies and a mysterious boy appear, with powered-up mischief-loving Yuni messing around with their wonderful days. It seems that the key to solve those are Mewkle Rain-Bow and everyone's power.

Characters from anime

Stuffed kittens

The main kitten protagonist, a light violet stuffed kitten. She is sweet and kind, and is afraid of dogs (except Q-chan). She ends her sentences with "~mya". She possesses the power of "Dream Synchro", an ability to enter one's dream. She fell down from the sky one day and was caught by Yume, thus becomes her Dream Partner. In Mix!, she caught Chia, who fell from the sky, and started taking care of her with Yume. It is later revealed that she who caught Chia at the beginning is Chia's Dream Partner, and according to an ancient book, same as Chia, she is also one of the princesses.

A light yellow stuffed kitten. He loves eating and making others laugh. He is Maira's partner. Like Maira, he speaks Kansei dialect. He and Maira makes a comedy duo named "Dasshi♡Fun'nyuu" (lit. "skim milk powder").

A light blue stuffed kitten. She is clever and gentle. She ends her sentences with "~desu". She is Kotoko's partner. Her glasses have several abilities, including detecting Black Abysses and watching past events by rewinding time.

A black stuffed kitten. He likes mischief, but is also quite clumsy. He is rival of Mew and co.. He created Tsugi and Hagi when he was lonely, and treasures them a lot. He ends his sentences with "~nyui". Working for the Queen of Nightmares, he uses Black Abysses to mess up people's dreams. Like Mew, he is a stuffed kitten from the sky, but was not made by the same fairies who made Mew and co.. After he was dropped to the human world, he was not discovered by anyone and thus was left alone, before the Queen of Nightmares made him become able to move and speak; this made him respect the Queen a lot. In season 1 episode 24, he becomes Haruhito's partner. In the last episode of the season, he left Haruhito for a journey, but returned at the beginning of Mix!.

A stuffed kitten created by Yuni. She likes Yuni a lot. She ends her sentences with "~tsugi".

A stuffed kitten created by Yuni. He likes Yuni a lot. He ends his sentences with "~hagi".

A pink stuffed kitten. She is cheerful and kind, and likes taking care of others. She is good at dream divination, sports and singing. She loves flowers. She is Tokiwa's partner.

A white stuffed kitten. His full name is "Rei de Richard". He calls himself "a prince of a royal family from the country of love". He is Asahi's partner.

A pink baby stuffed kitten that debuts in Mix!. She is energetic that can bring smiles to anyone. She loves being hugged. In the later part of the story, it is revealed that she is made to be the princess of Miracle Dreamy Kingdom, and there is the seed of Dreamy Lavender Flower embedded inside her heart.

A stuffed kitten created by Yuni, debuting in Mix!. It was originally a fake plushie used for stealing and replacing Chia, but was made alive after Yuni accidentally inserted Yuni-chi Abyss into it.

Humans

Major

The main human protagonist, a cheerful first-year junior high school student who enters the cheerleading club. She owns a dog named "Q-chan". She does not like cherry tomatoes. She by chance catches Mew who fell from the sky, becomes her Dream Partner, and starts collecting Dreamy Stones with her. She promotes to second year in Mix!. In the last part of Mix!, according to an ancient book, same as Chia, she is also one of the princesses.

A first-year junior high school student who is Yume's classmate and Peko's partner. Coming from Kyoto, she speaks in a Kansai dialect and lives with her father as her mother passed away since her childhood. She is a model of a popular fashion magazine. She knows a lot about fashion, but also loves comedy, hoping to become a comedian one day. She plans to establish a comedy studying club in school. She and Peko makes a comedy duo named "Dasshi♡Fun'nyuu". She promotes to second year in Mix!.

A third-year junior high school student who is Yume's senior and Suu's partner. Her grade is the top of the third-years, and she is the president of the computer club. She is good at taking care of others. Hoping for a society where humans and robots peacefully live together, she and the computer club put effort on creating robots; "Kotokoto" was her first robot. She promotes to high school in Mix!.

A first-year junior high school student who is Yume's classmate and neighbour, as well as childhood friend. He is good at sports, and enters the tennis club. He has a crush on Yume. He later becomes Rei's partner. He promotes to second year in Mix!.

A third-year junior high school student who is Yume's senior. He is the president of the boys' tennis club and the student council. He is popular in school. He has a younger brother called Akihito, who has superior intelligence, causing him to always feel inferior around him. Starting from season 1 episode 24, making use of his inferiority towards Akihito, he is controlled by the Queen of Nightmares and becomes Yuni's partner. Obeying the Queen, he begins to interfere Yume and Mew's purification of Black Abysses, as well as to steal Dreamy Stones. However, Haruhito gradually gained his conscience back because of the charm Yuri gave him; thus, the Queen inserted a Black Abyss into him in episode 37, making him completely be on the Queen's side. At the last part of the season, he showed his hostility towards Yume, and was about to erase her memories with Mew, along with his, but was interfered. He then suffered and fell into a coma for fighting his nightmares, striving to keep his precious memories. At the end, it was Yuri's wish and her charm that awakened him, making him back to normal. He promotes to high school in Mix!.

A first-year junior high school student who is Yume's classmate and Nene's partner. She is a transfer student who comes from the Yamanashi Prefecture. She is excellent at sports, and is also good at playing piano, astronomy and biology. She joins the cheerleading club and the choir club. Before transferring to Yume's school, she discovered Nene by a river. She promotes to second year in Mix!.

Haruhito's younger brother. He is a child prodigy with IQ of 250, and is currently studying at a university in America even at the age of 12. He becomes one of the main characters in Mix!, enrolling into Ichigo Junior High School to become a first-year student. He enters the computer club and becomes the new president. He hopes that humans can live in a virtual world; to make his dream world come true, he agrees to help Akumu to spread nightmares. He develops a crush on Yume later. In episode 43 of Mix!, after seeing Yume suffered from Akumu, he realized that Akumu's ambition is not what he wants, thus persuaded her to stop spreading nightmares. Akumu stopped working with him afterwards.

Ichigo Junior High School

A third-year junior high school student who is Haruhito's classmate and childhood friend. She is the president of the calligraphy club and the vice-president of the student council. She noticed something was wrong when Haruhito was obeying the Queen of Nightmares, thus asked Yume to check his condition for her, and asked her to give him a charm, named Dreamy Charm, to protect him. At the end of the season, it was her wish and her charm that awakened Haruhito, who was fighting his nightmares, making him back to normal. She got into a high school in London in the finale of the first season, and once returned to Japan in Episode 17 of Mix!.

A first-year junior high school student who is Yume's friend since grade school. She enters the cheerleading club with Yume. She has a crush on Shouhei. She promotes to second year in Mix!, and joins the comedy studying club.

A first-year junior high school student who is Yume's friend since grade school. She is well-informed on and likes to talk about romance gossips. She enters the tennis club. She seems to have a crush on Teacher Aoi. She promotes to second year in Mix!, and joins the comedy studying club.

A first-year junior high school student who is Yume's friend since grade school. She loves drawing, and enters the art club. She wishes to become a manga artist one day, but her storytelling is not really good. She later owns a cat named "Kuro-chan". She promotes to second year in Mix!, and joins the comedy studying club.

Yume's class teacher and the teacher of Class 1-1.

A first-year junior high school student who is Yume's friend since grade school. He is a good friend of Asahi. He promotes to second year in Mix!.

A third-year junior high school student who is Kaede's older sister. She is the president of the girls' tennis club.

A third-year junior high school student who is the president of the cheerleading club.

A second-year junior high school student who is a member of the cheerleading club who practices with Yume. She is Yume's senior. She later becomes the new president of the cheerleading club, replacing Misaki.

A third-year junior high school student who is the president of the Sugiyama fan club.

A second-year junior high school student who is a member of the student council. He later becomes the new vice-president of the student council, replacing Yuri.

A second-year junior high school student who is a member of the student council. She later becomes the new president of the student council, replacing Haruhito.

A second-year junior high school student who is a member of the boys' tennis club who is Asahi's senior. He later becomes the new president of the boys' tennis club, replacing Haruhito.

A third-year junior high school student who is the president of the choir club.

A first-year junior high school student who is a member of the girls' tennis club. She had a crush on Asahi, but was rejected. She later enters the Sugiyama fan club. She promotes to second year in Mix!, and is in the same class as Yume.

A first-year junior high school student who is a member of the girls' tennis club. She is Morimura's friend. She later enters the Sugiyama fan club with Morimura. She promotes to second year in Mix!, and is in the same class as Yume.

The cheerleading club's advisor. Her actual name is "Suzaki".

A second-year junior high school student who is the new president of the girls' tennis club, replacing Momiji.

A second-year junior high school student who is a member of the boys' tennis club and Asahi's senior.

She is a member of the art club.

She is a member of the art club.

A first-year junior high school student who is Yume's classmate. She was jealous of Maira, but later becomes her fan. She promotes to second year in Mix!, and joins the comedy studying club.

A first-year junior high school student who is Yume's classmate. She was jealous of Maira, but later becomes her fan. She promotes to second year in Mix!, and joins the comedy studying club.

A first-year junior high school student who is Yume's classmate. She was jealous of Maira, but later becomes her fan. She promotes to second year in Mix!, and joins the comedy studying club.

A third-year junior high school student who is the former vice-president of the computer club. He is sore at Kotoko for his robot losing to hers, but actually, he has a crush on her.

A first-year junior high school student who is Yume's classmate. She is the daughter of the owner of a Japanese sweets shop.

Major humans' family

Yume's mother. She is the section manager of her company.

Yume's younger cousin.

Tokiwa's younger brother who is Kenta's twin.

Tokiwa's younger brother who is Kanta's twin.

Kotoko's older brother. He studies at a university in America, and once came back to Japan in episode 44. He studies at the same school as Akihito's, and works with him in the laboratory. He returned to Japan again in Mix! with Akihito.

Tokiwa's older cousin. He works at the zoo.

Others

A model who is Maira's friend. She became the first victim of Akumu's magic in Mix!.

The daughter of APON Ranch's owner. She is Maira's fan. While Maira was visiting her ranch, she felt inferior because of Maira's charm, causing Yuni to insert Black Abyss into her.

The daughter of Patisserie Ichigo's owner and Yuuki's younger sister. She attends the same elementary school as Yume's. Due to their family business, their parents cannot hold a Christmas party for them, thus they were envious of others, causing Yuni to insert Yuni-chi Abysses into them. After their Yuni-chi Abysses being purified, they had a party with their parents in their dream, and was invited by the Queen Above the Skies to her castle.

The son of Patisserie Ichigo's owner and Ai's older brother. He attends the same elementary school as Yume's. Due to their family business, their parents cannot hold a Christmas party for them, thus they were envious of others, causing Yuni to insert Yuni-chi Abysses into them. After their Yuni-chi Abysses being purified, they had a party with their parents in their dream, and was invited by the Queen Above the Skies to her castle.

Debuting in Mix!, he is Asahi's opponent in a tennis match. He enjoys playing tennis very much, causing Yuni to insert Yuni-chi Abyss into him.

Debuting in Mix!, she is Kaoru's sister. They met Yume and co. while they are playing instruments in the rain on the hills.

Debuting in Mix!, she is Asako's sister. They met Yume and co. while they are playing instruments in the rain on the hills.

Miracle Dreamy Kingdom

The queen of Miracle Dreamy Kingdom. She appeared in Yume's dream and told her if she can collect a lot of Dreamy Stones with Mew, she can grant her one wish. Lyra/the Queen of Nightmares is her older sister.

The fairies are the inhabitants of Miracle Dreamy Kingdom, serving the Queen Above the Skies. Instructed by the Queen, they created plush kittens like Mew.

The antagonist of season 1. She gave life to Yuni, and orders him to spread Black Abysses. She also assigned Haruhito as a partner to Yuni by controlling him, making use of his inferiority towards Akihito. Lucia/the Queen Above the Skies is her younger sister. They were in a good relationship when they were young, but she felt inferior that her sister was more popular around the fairies despite her hard work. After her sister accidentally burnt her pickled radish, she left the kingdom, and became even angrier finding out her sister, after becoming the Queen, seems not to care about her leaving. She then decided to bring nightmares to the human world, thus the making of Yuni. The reason she chose Haruhito is that his experience is similar to hers. At the end of the season, she reconciled with her sister, and moved back to the kingdom, becoming the Queen of the kingdom with her.

She appeared in the last part of season 1, and is the antagonist of season 2. She wishes to change hopes and dreams into nightmares, and to build Nightmare Land. About 2000 years ago, she was the queen of Miracle Dreamy Kingdom, originally named Omoro. Loving interesting things, she wanted to build Amusing Land to make everyone feel excited, thus started to collect people's dreams. However, gradually, normal dreams could not satisfy Omoro, so she decided to spread nightmares, changed her name to Akumu, and built Nightmare Land, causing the world to be once covered in nightmares. Nevertheless, she was later sealed in Ichigo Hill, until the end of season 1 when Lyra's Nightmare Castle at the hill was collapsed, releasing Akumu. In Episode 48, she was purified and returned to Omoro.

Others

A dog owned by the Hinata family. At first, it was scared of by Mew, who is afraid of dogs, but it actually wanted to become her friend; after the events in season 1 episode 9, they finally get closer.

A tanuki who lived on a cape and is now a ghost. He and Poko is a pair of couple, but were separated and he lost his memory after becoming a ghost. With Yume and co.'s help, he retrieved his memory and went to heaven with Poko.

A tanuki who lived on a cape and is now a ghost. She and Ponkichi is a pair of couple, but were separated. In order to retrieve Ponkichi's memory, she borrowed the body of an old woman who is the janitor of Yume's training camp site. In the end, she went to heaven with Ponkichi.

A black cat which was once a stray animal. It was constantly bullied by a big cat. It met Hana at a park and became familiar with her. After experiencing events caused by Black Abysses with Hana, it became Hana's pet.

Media

Anime
An anime television series based on the toy franchise was announced at the Sanrio Expo 2019 to be animated by J.C.Staff. Chiaki Kon (Golden Time, Devils and Realist) was to direct the series with Natsumi Murakami be the first cast member to be announced. On September 10, 2019, a promotional video released by Sanrio's YouTube channel introduced additional characters in the anime. On January 31, 2020, the anime's website that the anime would premiere in April. The site also announced ten more cast members and three more staff members, including Hiroko Kanasugi (NouCome, RobiHachi) as writer and Mai Furuki (Planet With) as character designer. However Kon stepped down as director due to unknown issues and will remain in the project as Project Consultant. The directorial role will be filled out by Hiroaki Sakurai (Di Gi Charat, UFO Baby, The Disastrous Life of Saiki K.) instead. On February 27, 2020, the anime was confirmed to be premiere on April 5, 2020, and more cast members and characters, as well as the theme songs were announced. On April 26, 2020, Sanrio announced that episode 5 and later episodes would be delayed due to the ongoing COVID-19 pandemic. On May 23, 2020, it was revealed that new episodes would resume on May 31, 2020, with the series continuing until April 4, 2021.

A second season, titled Mewkledreamy Mix!, aired from April 11, 2021 to March 27, 2022, with the staff members returning to reprise their roles.

Episode list

Mewkledreamy

Mewkledreamy Mix!

Music
Maria Sawada performed both the first season's opening theme  and the ending theme . The series's music is composed by Ruka Kawada (Is the Order a Rabbit?).

For the second season, Mix!, Icchy & Naru performed both the opening theme  and the ending theme .

Manga
A tie-in manga adaptation is being serialized in two of Kodansha's magazines, Otomodachi and Tanoshii Yōchien, since April 2020 issue.

Notes

References

External links
Sanrio's official website 
Official anime website for Mewkledreamy 
Official anime website for Mewkledreamy Mix! 
TV Tokyo anime website for Mewkledreamy 
TV Tokyo anime website for Mewkledreamy Mix! 

2020 manga
Animated television series about cats
Anime postponed due to the COVID-19 pandemic
Anime productions suspended due to the COVID-19 pandemic
Magical girl anime and manga
Child characters in anime and manga
J.C.Staff
Kodansha manga
Mass media franchises introduced in 2017
Sanrio characters
Sanrio
TV Tokyo original programming